Sareung Station is a railway station on the Gyeongchun Line in Jingeon-eup, Namyangju-si, Gyeonggi-do, South Korea. It is named after Sareung, the royal tomb of Queen Jeongsun, the queen consort of Danjong, the sixth king of the Joseon Dynasty.

Station Layout

External links
 Station information from Korail

Railway stations in Gyeonggi Province
Seoul Metropolitan Subway stations
Metro stations in Namyangju
Railway stations opened in 1939